Muhammad Sibtain Khan is a Pakistani politician who is serving as the current Speaker of the Provincial Assembly of the Punjab, and he had been the Provincial Minister of Punjab for Forestry, Wildlife and Fisheries, in office from 29 August 2018. He had been a member of the Provincial Assembly of the Punjab from August 2018 till January 2023. He served as Provincial Minister of Punjab for Forestry, Wildlife and Fisheries from 7 January 2020 to April 2022.

Previously he was a member of the Provincial Assembly of the Punjab between 1990 and May 2018.

Early life and education
He was born on 30 August 1950 in Mianwali.

He has the degree of Master of Arts in Political Science which he obtained in 1982 from University of the Punjab.

Political career
He was elected to the Provincial Assembly of the Punjab as an independent candidate from Constituency PP-39 (Mianwali-IV) in 1990 Pakistani general election. He received 29,582 votes and defeated a candidate of Islami Jamhoori Ittehad (IJI). He served a Provincial Minister of Punjab for Prison from 1990 to 1993.

He ran for the seat of the Provincial Assembly of the Punjab as an independent candidate from Constituency PP-39 (Mianwali-IV) in 1997 Pakistani general election, but was unsuccessful. He received 15,390 votes and lost the seat to a candidate of Pakistan Muslim League (N).

He was re-elected to the Provincial Assembly of the Punjab as a candidate of Pakistan Muslim League (Q) (PML-Q) from Constituency PP-46 (Mianwali-IV) in 2002 Pakistani general election. He received 36,815 votes and defeated an independent candidate. In January 2003, he was inducted into the provincial Punjab cabinet of Chief Minister Chaudhry Pervaiz Elahi and was appointed as Provincial Minister of Punjab for Mines and Minerals where he remained until 2007.

He ran for the seat of the Provincial Assembly of the Punjab as a candidate of PML-Q from Constituency PP-46 (Mianwali-IV) in 2008 Pakistani general election but was unsuccessful. He received 27,319 votes and lost the seat to Muhammad Feroz Joyia, an independent candidate.

He was re-elected to the Provincial Assembly of the Punjab as a candidate of Pakistan Tehreek-e-Insaf (PTI) from Constituency PP-46 (Mianwali-IV) in 2013 Pakistani general election.

He was re-elected to the Provincial Assembly of the Punjab as a candidate of PTI from Constituency PP-88 (Mianwali-IV) in 2018 Pakistani general election.

On 27 August 2018, he was inducted into the provincial Punjab cabinet of Chief Minister Sardar Usman Buzdar without any ministerial portfolio. On 29 August 2018, he was appointed as Provincial Minister of Punjab for Forestry, Wildlife and Fisheries.

In June 2019, he was arrested by National Accountability Bureau Lahore due to corruption charges due to this he was removed from his post of Provincial Minister of Punjab for Forestry, Wildlife and Fisheries.

In January 2020, He was reappointed as Provincial Minister of Punjab for Forestry, Wildlife and Fisheries.

On 27 July 2022, the PTI nominated him for the role of Speaker of the Provincial Assembly of Punjab, which was vacated due to the election of former Speaker Chaudhry Pervaiz Elahi to the chief ministership. The election for the post of Speaker was conducted on 29 July 2022, in which he was successful.

References

Living people
Punjab MPAs 2013–2018
1958 births
University of the Punjab alumni
People from Mianwali District
Punjab MPAs 1990–1993
Punjab MPAs 2002–2007
Punjab MPAs 2018–2023
Pakistan Tehreek-e-Insaf MPAs (Punjab)
Provincial ministers of Punjab
Pakistani prisoners and detainees